Namsan (남산, 南山, "South Mountain") is a 539-meter peak in Chagang Province, North Korea.

Mountains of North Korea